The Amsterdam Marathon (branded TCS Amsterdam Marathon for sponsorship reasons) is an annual marathon (42.195 km) in Amsterdam in the Netherlands since 1975. The road race has a Platinum Label from World Athletics.  During the event, there are also a half marathon race (21.097 km) and an 8 km race in the program.

History

The first marathon in Amsterdam was held on 5 August 1928, during the 1928 Summer Olympics. It was won by Boughera El Ouafi in 2:32:57.

After the Olympics there were no marathons in Amsterdam until 1975. Since that year the marathon was held annually, with the exception of 1978 and 2020.

The 1980 course record of 2:09:01 ran by Dutchman Gerard Nijboer could be considered an unofficial world record as the generally recognized record at that time, 2:08:34 in Antwerp, had been run on a course that was 500 meters short. However, IAAF doesn't recognise Nijboer time as any record.

In 2005, the former world record holder on the marathon, Haile Gebrselassie, earned his first win in the Amsterdam Marathon in the fastest marathon time in the world for the 2006 season (2:06.20).

In 2010, Getu Feleke finished in 2:05:44 and improved the course record from 2009 by 34 seconds.

In 2012, the Kenyan Wilson Chebet won the race by a time of 2:05:41 and broke the previous course record by three seconds. In the same year, Ethiopian Meseret Hailu broke the women's course record with a time of 2:21:09.

In 2017, Kenya’s Lawrence Cherono was the surprise winner of the TCS Amsterdam Marathon, taking more than a minute off his PB to set a new course record of 2:05:09. He went on to defend his title in 2018 and set a new course record of 2:04:06.

The 2020 in-person edition of the race was cancelled due to the coronavirus pandemic, with all entries automatically transferred to 2021, and all registrants given the option of transferring their entry to another runner.

Route
The route starts and finishes in the Olympic Stadium. The course is flat, with a maximum elevation of 33 ft at the 23rd mile.

References

External links

Marathons in the Netherlands
Autumn events in the Netherlands
Annual events in Amsterdam
Sports competitions in Amsterdam
Recurring sporting events established in 1975
1975 establishments in the Netherlands